Snoopy Tennis is a sports video game developed by the British company Mermaid Studios and published by Infogrames. It was released for the Game Boy Color in 2001.

Reception

The game was met with positive reception, as GameRankings gave it a score of 85% based on only two reviews. In Japan, where the game was ported for release on June 20, 2001, Famitsu gave it a score of 20 out of 40.

References

External links

2001 video games
Game Boy Color games
Game Boy Color-only games
Infogrames games
Tennis video games
Video games about dogs
Video games based on Peanuts
Video games developed in the United Kingdom
Multiplayer and single-player video games